Dave Rich is Head of Policy at the Community Security Trust and is a leading expert on left-wing antisemitism, according to The Jewish Chronicle. He is an associate research fellow at the Pears Institute for the Study of Antisemitism, where he completed his PhD. Rich has written a book, published in 2016,  The Left's Jewish Problem: Jeremy Corbyn, Israel and Anti‑Semitism  which began as his doctoral dissertation.

References

External links
Dr Dave Rich, faculty profile, Pears Institute for the Study of Antisemitism, University of London

Living people
Scholars of antisemitism
Alumni of Birkbeck, University of London
English writers
English people of Jewish descent
Year of birth missing (living people)